Bastien Lachaud (born 5 August 1980) is a French politician representing La France insoumise. He was elected to the French National Assembly on 18 June 2017, representing the department of Seine-Saint-Denis.

A former history teacher, Lachaud was a member of the Socialist Party until 2008, when he left the party to join the newly formed Left Party, and became national secretary for the party. Lachaud also lead the national legislative campaign for FI.

See also
 2017 French legislative election

References

1980 births
Living people
Deputies of the 15th National Assembly of the French Fifth Republic
La France Insoumise politicians
Socialist Party (France) politicians
Left Party (France) politicians
People from Vitry-sur-Seine
Members of Parliament for Seine-Saint-Denis
Deputies of the 16th National Assembly of the French Fifth Republic